City Kids is the seventh album by Spyro Gyra, released in 1983. At Billboard magazine, it reached No. 66 on the Top 200 Albums chart, and No. 2 on that magazine's Jazz Albums chart.

Track listing

Personnel 
Credits adapted from AllMusic.

Spyro Gyra
 Jay Beckenstein – alto saxophone, soprano saxophone, Lyricon
 Tom Schuman – electric piano (1, 2, 5, 6, 7), synthesizers (1, 2, 5, 6, 7)
 Jeremy Wall – acoustic piano (4, 5), synthesizers (4, 5)
 Chet Catallo – guitar (1, 2, 3, 5, 7)
 Kim Stone – bass (1)
 Eli Konikoff – drums (1)
 Gerardo Velez – percussion (1, 5, 7)
 Dave Samuels – marimba (4, 5), vibraphone (4, 5)

Guests
 Richard Tee – acoustic piano (4, 8), electric piano (4, 8)
 Hiram Bullock – guitar (2, 4, 7)
 Steve Love – acoustic guitar (2, 4, 5, 7, 8), electric guitar (2, 4, 5, 7, 8), guitar solo (2, 4)
 Will Lee  – bass (2, 4)
 Eddie Gómez – bass (3, 6)
 Marcus Miller – bass (5, 7, 8)
 Steve Jordan – drums (2, 4, 7)
 Steve Gadd – drums (3, 4, 5, 6, 9), percussion (3, 4, 5, 6, 9)
 Manolo Badrena – congas (1, 2, 3, 5, 6), percussion (1, 2, 3, 5, 6)
 Lou Marini – tenor saxophone 
 Dave Bargeron – trombone
 Alan Rubin – flugelhorn, trumpet
 Lew Soloff – flugelhorn, trumpet
 Rob Zantay – Lyricon programming
 Lani Groves – vocals (1)

Production 
 Jay Beckenstein – producer 
 Richard Calandra – producer
 Jeremy Wall – assistant producer (1, 6)
 Tom Schuman – assistant producer (1, 6)
 Michael Barry – engineer 
 John Penzotti – assistant engineer
 Bob Troeller – assistant engineer
 Bob Ludwig – mastering at Masterdisk (New York, NY).
 George Osaki – art direction, design 
 Michael G. Cobb – cover illustration

References 

1983 albums
Spyro Gyra albums
MCA Records albums